The Supernatural may refer to:

 The supernatural
 "The Supernatural", a song by John Mayall & the Bluesbreakers, from the album A Hard Road
 The Supernatural, by Erwin Neutzsky-Wulff, a book on supernatural phenomena, presenting scientifically structured arguments for the presence of supernatural forces
 The Supernaturals, a five-piece guitar pop band
 The Supernaturals (film), a 1986 horror film starring Maxwell Caulfield, Nichelle Nichols and Talia Balsam
 Super Naturals, a 1987 action figure toyline from Tonka featuring a hologram covering face and torso that alternated between two images (depending on character an anthropomorphic animal, a monster or a human) and glow in the dark weapons, most also included a shield that showed a matching image

See also
 Supernatural (disambiguation)